The Christmas Collection may refer to:

 Christmas Collection, a 1996 album by The Carpenters containing all tracks from their two Christmas albums, Christmas Portrait and An Old-Fashioned Christmas
 The Christmas Collection (Il Divo album), 2005
 The Christmas Collection (Amy Grant album), 2008
 Frank Sinatra Christmas Collection, 2004
 Christmas Collection (Gaither Vocal Band album), 2015